The 2023 Nigerian Senate elections in Zamfara State will be held on 25 February 2023, to elect the 3 federal Senators from Zamfara State, one from each of the state's three senatorial districts. The elections will coincide with the 2023 presidential election, as well as other elections to the Senate and elections to the House of Representatives; with state elections being held two weeks later. Primaries were held between 4 April and 9 June 2022.

Background
In the previous Senate elections, none of the three incumbent senators were returned as Kabir Garba Marafa (APC-Central) and Ahmad Sani Yerima (APC-North) retired while Tijjani Yahaya Kaura (APC-West) was disqualified alongside all other Zamfara APC nominees. With the disqualification, PDP runners-up—Hassan Muhammed Gusau (Central), Sahabi Alhaji Yaú (North), and Lawali Hassan Anka (West)—were declared victors by court ruling. The ruling also overturned APC victories in the gubernatorial, House of Representatives, and House of Assembly elections before awarding those offices to the PDP runners-up.

Overview

Summary

Zamfara Central 

The Zamfara Central Senatorial District covers the local government areas of Bungudu, Gusau, Maru, and Tsafe. The seat is vacant as Senator Hassan Muhammed Gusau (APC), who was elected in 2019 as a member of the PDP, resigned from the Senate on 23 February 2022 to become Deputy Governor of Zamfara State.

General election

Results

Zamfara North 

The Zamfara North Senatorial District covers the local government areas of Birnin Magaji/Kiyaw, Kaura Namoda, Shinkafi, Talata Mafara, and Zurmi. Incumbent Sahabi Alhaji Yaú (APC), who was elected in 2019 as a member of the PDP, is seeking re-election.

General election

Results

Zamfara West 

The Zamfara West Senatorial District covers the local government areas of Anka, Bakura, Bukkuyum, Gummi, and Maradun. Incumbent Lawali Hassan Anka (APC), who was elected in 2019 as a member of the PDP, is opted not to seek re-election.

General election

Results

Notes

See also 
 2023 Nigerian Senate election
 2023 Nigerian elections
 2023 Zamfara State elections

References 

Zamfara State senatorial elections
2023 Zamfara State elections
Zamfara State Senate elections